Disney's Math Quest with Aladdin is a 1997 educational game by Disney Interactive, and part of the Aladdin franchise. It was released as a CD-ROM for Windows and Macintosh personal computers.

References

Classic Mac OS games
Windows games
1997 video games
Children's educational video games
Mathematical education video games
Aladdin (franchise) video games
Video games developed in the United States